Dmytro Pospelov (Ukrainian: Дмитро Олексійович Поспєлов; born 19 October 1991) is a Ukrainian footballer who plays for Inhulets Petrove.

Career

Pospelov started his senior career with Odessa in the Ukrainian First League, where he made seventy-one appearances and scored zero goals. After that, he played for Turan-Tovuz IK, Real Pharma Odesa, Zhemchuzhyna Odesa, Metalist 1925 Kharkiv, was free transferred to Chornomorets Odesa in August 2020, and was then free transferred to Inhulets Petrove in July 2021.

References

External links 
 Pospelov: “The Turanian Harlem Shake was dedicated to Popovich”
 Dmitry POSPELOV: “We do not have equivalent replacements for leaders”
 Dmitry Pospelov: “For a football player, training camps are critical days”
 
 
 

1991 births
Living people
Footballers from Odesa
FC Zhemchuzhyna Odesa players
FC Metalist 1925 Kharkiv players
FC Real Pharma Odesa players
FC Chornomorets Odesa players
FC Inhulets Petrove players
Ukrainian footballers
Association football defenders
Ukrainian expatriate footballers
Expatriate footballers in Azerbaijan
Ukrainian expatriate sportspeople in Azerbaijan